Clearfield Community School District was a school district headquartered in Clearfield, Iowa. It operated one school: Clearfield Community School.

In 2014 the district had a total of 27 students.

Due to a declining financial situation, the district leadership attempted to find another school district willing to do a consolidation, but it could not find a willing merger partner. The voters approved a proposal to dissolve the district. Four other school districts absorbed pieces of the Clearfield district: Bedford, Diagonal, Lenox, and Mt Ayr. The dissolution was effective July 1, 2014.

References

Further reading

External links
 Clearfield Community School District
 

Defunct school districts in Iowa
School districts disestablished in 2014
2014 disestablishments in Iowa
Education in Taylor County, Iowa
Education in Ringgold County, Iowa